The South-west Corner Marine Park (formerly South-west Corner Commonwealth Marine Reserve) is a marine protected area on the lower south west and southern coast of Western Australia, one of 14 in the South-west Marine Parks Network.

It was gazetted in 14 December 2013 and was renamed on 11 October 2017.

Features

The key ecological features of the marine park include:

 Albany Canyon
 Cape Mentelle upwelling
 Diamantina Fracture Zone
 Naturaliste Plateau
 Donnelly Banks

The marine park is located in Commonwealth waters (further away from the coastline) equivalent of the state marine park Ngari Capes Marine Park, which exists within Western Australian state jurisdiction.

Major conservation values

The South-west Corner Marine Park has the following major conservation values: 
Important migratory area for protected humpback whales and blue whales
Important foraging areas for the:
threatened white shark
threatened Australian sea lion
threatened Indian yellow-nosed albatross and soft-plumaged petrel
migratory sperm whale
migratory flesh-footed shearwater, short-tailed shearwater and Caspian tern
Seasonal calving habitat for the threatened southern right whale
Representation of three provincial bioregions (the South-west Transition and Southern Province in the off-shelf area, and the South-west Shelf Province on the continental shelf)  and two meso-scale bioregions (southern end of the Leeuwin-Naturaliste meso-scale bioregion and western and central parts of the Western Australia South Coast meso-scale bioregion)
Six key ecological features:
Albany Canyon group (high productivity, feeding aggregations)
Cape Mentelle upwelling (high productivity)
Diamantina Fracture Zone (unique sea-floor feature likely to support deepwater communities characterised by high species diversity and endemism)
Naturaliste Plateau (unique sea-floor feature, likely to support deepwater communities characterised by high species diversity and endemism)
 western rock lobster habitat (species with an important ecological role)
Commonwealth marine environment surrounding the Recherche Archipelago (high biodiversity, breeding and resting aggregations, including the most extensive areas of reef on the shelf within the South-west Marine Region)
Representation of the Donnelly Banks, east of Augusta, characterised by higher productivity and including nursery habitats

See also
 Protected areas managed by the Australian government
 Integrated Marine and Coastal Regionalisation of Australia

Notes

External links
Official webpage
 Interactive Map, Commonwealth marine reserves

 Required attribution: © Commonwealth of Australia 2013

IUCN Category II
IUCN Category VI
Australian marine parks
South coast of Western Australia